Shikhar Municipality is a municipality located in Doti District of Sudurpashchim Province of Nepal. It is surrounded by Dipayal Silgadhi in the East, Dadeldhura District in the West, Adarsha in the North and K. I. Singh and Jorayal in the South.

History

On 10 March 2017 Government of Nepal announced 744 local level units as per the new constitution of Nepal 2015. thus this local level unit came into existence. The municipality is divided into 11 wards. Kapalleki, Mudhegaun, Mudabhara, Tijali, Pachanali, Latamandau, Jijodamandau, Banalek and Warpata villages were merged to form this new local level unit.

Demographics
At the time of the 2011 Nepal census, Shikhar Municipality had a population of 32,326. Of these, 97.8% spoke Doteli, 1.9% Nepali,  0.1% Maithili, 0.1% Bhojpuri and 0.1% other languages as their first language.

In terms of ethnicity/caste, 53.8% were Chhetri, 14.6% Kami, 11.2% Hill Brahmin, 5.2% Damai/Dholi, 4.9% other Dalit, 3.9% Thakuri, 2.1% Lohar, 1.6% Sarki, 0.8% Sanyasi/Dasnami, 0.5% Badi, 0.4% other Terai, 0.3% Newar, 0.2% Musalman, 0.1% Bengali,  0.1% Gurung, 0.1% Chamar/Harijan/Ram, 0.1% Magar and 0.2% others.

In terms of religion, 99.7% were Hindu and 0.2% Muslim.

References

External links

Android app for municipality

Municipalities in Doti District
Nepal municipalities established in 2017